John Gerald Collee (born 1955) is a Scottish screenwriter whose film scripts include Master and Commander (2003), Happy Feet (2006), Creation (2009), and Walking with Dinosaurs (2013). He is also a journalist and a novelist. Collee practised medicine and wrote several novels before he became a full-time screenwriter.

Background
Collee was born in 1955 to Isobel and J. Gerald, the latter who was a professor of bacteriology at the University of Edinburgh. Collee grew up in Edinburgh, Scotland and in India. He studied medicine at the University of Edinburgh and began practising medicine in Cambridge, Bath, and Bristol. In his third year of practice, he wrote the medical thriller Kingsley's Touch, which was published in 1984. Collee subsequently worked in emergency medicine and worked as a doctor in countries like Gabon, Madagascar, and Sri Lanka. He then wrote a second novel titled A Paper Mask, which was published in 1987. Rights to the novel were acquired for a film adaptation, and Collee wrote the screenplay for director Christopher Morahan, who released the film Paper Mask in 1990. With income from screenwriting, Collee wrote his third novel The Rig, which was published in 1991. Around the same time The Rig was published, Collee became a weekly columnist for The Observer and wrote about travel, science and medicine for the next six years.

Collee met his wife Deborah Snow on the way to Azerbaijan; he was escorting a shipment of medical aid when he met Snow, who was a TV correspondent in Moscow, Russia for the Australian Broadcasting Corporation. When he began writing a book about Soviet medicine called The Kingdom of the Blind, he visited Moscow and Snow. The book was unfinished, but when Collee went to the Solomon Islands for a year to work as a doctor, Snow went with him, and they had their first child, Lauren, on the islands. He worked in London for a short time before moving to Sydney, Australia in 1996 to meet Australian directors like Peter Weir and George Miller. For Weir, Collee wrote the screenplay for the Oscar-nominated Master and Commander: The Far Side of the World, and for Miller, he wrote the Oscar-winning Happy Feet. He wrote an early (uncredited) draft of The Legend of Tarzan for Warner Bros. with Guillermo del Toro slated to direct.

Creation reunited him with Paul Bettany and he later executive-produced The Water Diviner with Russell Crowe directing. Tanna was a collaboration with anthropological film-makers Bentley Dean and Martin Butler which was shortlisted for an Oscar in the foreign language category. Wolf Totem with director Jean-Jacques Annaud made upwards of $100M at the Chinese Box office. After co-writing Hotel Mumbai, which starred actor Dev Patel, he collaborated with Patel on the actor's first film as director, Monkey Man.

He has also written for radio, for example Brogue Male with Paul B. Davies.

John Collee is one of four co-founders of the Australian production company Hopscotch Features. He is also a board member of the Australian branch of climate activist group 350.org. and Vice-President of the Australian Writers Guild

Filmography
Screenwriter

Bergerac - four TV episodes (BBC1, 1988-1990)
Star Cops - three TV episodes (BBC2, 1988)
Paper Mask (1990) - based on Collee's novel.
The Heart Surgeon – two-part TV serial (BBC1 1997)
Master and Commander: The Far Side of the World (2003) – with director Peter Weir; based on the novels by Patrick O'Brian.
Happy Feet (2006) – credited with director and co-directors.
Creation (2009) - based on the biography of Charles Darwin by Randal Keynes.
Walking with Dinosaurs (2013)
Wolf Totem (2015) – credited with director and two others; based on the novel by Jiang Rong.
Tanna (2015) – credited with directors.
The Patriarch (2016) – based on a novel by Witi Ihimaera.
Hotel Mumbai (2018) 

Executive producer
Son of a Gun (2014)
The Water Diviner (2014)
The Guests (short) (2015)

See also
List of Scottish novelists

Bibliography

References

External links

1955 births
Living people
Scottish screenwriters
Alumni of the University of Edinburgh
Writers from Edinburgh